Eric Christopher Grunsky
 is a Canadian mathematical geoscientist specialized in statistical petrology. Grunsky received the Felix Chayes Prize in 2005 from the International Association for Mathematical Geosciences and served as Editor-in-Chief for the journal Computers & Geosciences from 2006-2011. He was awarded the  Krumbein Medal in 2012 by the International Association for Mathematical Geosciences. He is currently serving International Association for Mathematical Geosciences (IAMG) as its appointed Secretary General.

Education
PhD University of Ottawa, 1988 
MSc University of Toronto, 1978
BSc University of Toronto, 1973

Early professional career

Awards and honors

William Christian Krumbein Medal (2012)
IAMG Distinguished Lectureship (2014)

Books

References

Living people
Scientists from Ontario
Canadian statisticians
Canadian geochemists
20th-century Canadian scientists
21st-century Canadian scientists
University of Toronto alumni
University of Ottawa alumni
University of Waterloo alumni
Academic staff of the University of Waterloo
Geological Survey of Canada personnel
Year of birth missing (living people)